Old Time Baseball is a 1995 baseball video game designed and programmed by Don Daglow, Hudson Piehl, Clay Dreslough, and James Grove. It was developed and published for MS-DOS by Storm-front Studios. Old Time Baseball uses the Tony La Russa Baseball engine, substituting lineups from 1871 to 1981, 12,000 players in all, and 16 ballparks with accurate dimensions.

Gameplay

Teams
Players can replay historical seasons for any league during this period from every major league in baseball history:
 National Association
 National League
 American Association
 Union Association
 Players' League
 American League
 Federal League

In addition to playing with historical teams, users could build their own teams player by player, and play any team (custom or historical) against any other team.

Ballparks
Many of the historical ballparks were built based on actual old construction blueprints.  Stadiums included:
 Ebbets Field, former home of the Brooklyn Dodgers, with the "hit this spot, win a suit" and the Schaefer's Beer sign on the outfield walls.
 Old Comiskey Park, at that time scheduled for demolition by the Chicago White Sox.
 Crosley Field, former home of the Cincinnati Reds. 
 Fenway Park, as it appeared in the heyday of Ted Williams, Johnny Pesky and Bobby Doerr.
 Polo Grounds, former home of the New York Giants, with its cavernous center field where Willie Mays caught the famous Vic Wertz drive in the 1954 World Series.
 Shibe Park, former home of both the Philadelphia Phillies and the Philadelphia Athletics.
 Sportsman's Park, former home of the St. Louis Cardinals and St. Louis Browns where more games were played than any other park in history. 
 Wrigley Field, from the days of Ernie Banks and Ron Santo.
 Yankee Stadium, in its pre-1970s form with the short right field porch and spacious left field, all designed to aid Babe Ruth and inspiring the nickname, The House that Ruth Built.

Announcers
Users can select between Play by play announcers Mel Allen of the New York Yankees and Curt Gowdy, who did network broadcasts for many years in addition to announcing for the Boston Red Sox.

Baseball Time Machine

Baseball Time Machine, allows users to play any game in any individual year from 1871 through the present.  This includes games in unique times like 1930, when baseball sought to lure fans during the Depression and juiced the ball so much that the batting average for baseball overall surpassed .300.  The following year the ball was returned to more typical physics.

Other popular "let's see what happens" years for players are 1871, when the game visually looked more like softball, and 1942–45, when World War II stripped the major leagues of most of its established players.

The Baseball Time Machine allows players to try to resolve the most famous baseball arguments of all time, What would happen if Sandy Koufax pitched to Babe Ruth?, How would the 1927 Yankees do against the Big Red Machine?, etc.

The game also offers the chance to play games in any of six different major baseball eras:
 1871–1892 -- Early Baseball, when the field dimensions were different and pitchers threw the ball softball-style, underhanded.
 1893–1919 -- The Dead Ball Era, when the pitcher's mound location and pitching style matched modern baseball, but the ball was marginally softer and would not fly as far.  During this era it was routine for 10 home runs to be the league leader's total, and a majority of those might be inside the park home runs that were the result of speed, not power.
 1920–1945 -- The Babe Ruth Era, when then-pitcher Ruth changed the game by his tremendous power, and the live ball replaced the dead ball as baseball sought to make fans forget the Black Sox Scandal.
 1946–1960 -- The Golden Age, when post-war optimism, television and the integration of baseball by Jackie Robinson, Larry Doby and Branch Rickey created a new level of success for the game.
 1961–1976 -- The Expansion Era, when baseball added many new teams, both increasing its influence and diluting its talent even as other sports like American football, basketball and ice hockey eroded its dominance of TV sports.
 1977–1995 -- Modern Baseball, when continued expansion and the Free Agency created by the growth of the players union continued to change the game.

Development
Daglow had written the basic mathematical models for the Baseball Time Machine in an unpublished 1980 game with the working title Apple Baseball, an extension of his Baseball game which he wrote on the then-new Apple II before joining the Intellivision game design team.

See also
Baseball mainframe computer game
Intellivision World Series Baseball
Earl Weaver Baseball
Tony La Russa Baseball
ESPN Baseball Tonight

References

External links

Old Time Baseball at GameFAQs

1995 video games
DOS games
DOS-only games
Major League Baseball video games
North America-exclusive video games
Stormfront Studios games
Video games developed in the United States